The Moment was a live television series on TVNZ DUKE. Broadcast weeknights during the 2018 Commonwealth Games presented by Matt Heath and Mike Lane.

The show chronicled the sports of the day with a New Zealand perspective and featured comedic commentary over highlights of selected events.

Each episode featured a live cross to a 1 News reporter, with appearances by Peter Williams, Jenny-May Clarkson and Andrew Saville.

References

New Zealand sports television series
Commonwealth Games in New Zealand
2018 New Zealand television series debuts
2018 New Zealand television series endings
TVNZ original programming